The Greater Tacoma Convention Center, is a convention center in downtown Tacoma, in the U.S. state of Washington.  It opened in November 2004 and has been described as the "second largest meeting and event facility in Western Washington". It was designed by MulvannyG2 Architecture, of Bellevue, Washington.

There are 400 parking spaces on-site. The convention center is also served by Tacoma Link at the Convention Center/S. 15th Street station. Buses operated by Pierce Transit also serve the convention center, with stops on nearby Pacific Avenue, as well as on Market Street and on 13th Street.

The Commerce Room can be used by convention groups as an additional breakout room or on its own  for smaller events with a capacity for 180 people.

References

External links

Buildings and structures in Tacoma, Washington
Tacoma
Tourist attractions in Tacoma, Washington